John Abercrombie (1726 – 2 May 1806) was a Scottish horticulturist important to renovating garden techniques. He is noted for the book Every Man His Own Gardener (1767), which he co-wrote with Thomas Mawe.

Biography

Abercrombie was born in Edinburgh. As a young man Abercrombie was employed at the Royal Gardens at Kew, and at Leicester House; and later set up a successful market gardening business in Hackney and later at Tottenham. He wrote a number of works on gardening.

For the last 20 years of his life, Abercrombie was a heavy consumer of tea and a vegetarian. He smoked his pipe for six hours a day and stated that tea and tobacco were promoters of his health. He died from injuries obtained from an accident.

Selected writings
 The Universal Gardener and Botanist; or, a General Dictionary of Gardening and Botany (1778)
 The Garden Mushroom (1779)
 The British Fruit Gardener; and Art of Pruning (1779)
 A General System of Trees and Shrubs (ca. 1780)
 Every Man His Own Gardener, 9th edition (1782)

References

Further reading

External links

1726 births
1806 deaths
18th-century Scottish businesspeople
Academics of the University of Cambridge
People from Prestonpans
Scottish agronomists
Scottish horticulturists
Scottish gardeners